The Iowa Crush are a women's tackle football in the Independent Women's Football League

The Crush are composed of talents from all across Iowa.

Season-By-Season 

|-
| colspan="6" align="center" | Des Moines Courage (IWFL)
|-
|2004 || 1 || 3 || 0 || X-Team || -- || PS  || 30  || PA || 126
|-
|2005 || 2 || 6 || 0 || X-Team || -- || PS  || 112  || PA || 228
|-
| colspan="6" align="center" | Iowa Crush (IWFL)
|-
|2006 || 4 || 4 || 0 || X-Team || -- || PS  || 162  || PA || 195 
|-
|2007 || 2 || 6 || 0 || 4th West Midwest || -- || PS  || 70  || PA || 246 
|-
|2008 || 0 || 8 || 0 || 3rd West Mid-South || -- || PS  || 13  || PA || 354 
|-
|2009 || 0 || 8 || 0 || 23rd Tier II || -- || PS  || 41  || PA || 276 
|-
|2010* || 3 || 5 || 0 || 5th Tier II West Midwest || -- || PS  || 110  || PA || 207 
|-
!Totals || 12 || 40 || 0 || -- || -- || TS  || 538  || PA || 1632

External links
 Iowa Crush
 IWFL - Independent Women's Football League

Independent Women's Football League
Warren County, Iowa
Sports in Des Moines, Iowa
American football teams in Iowa
American football teams established in 2004
2004 establishments in Iowa
Women in Iowa